Philip Rowland Filleul (15 July 1885 – 29 July 1974) was a British rower who competed in the 1908 Summer Olympics.

Filleul was born at Bath, Somerset. He was strokeman in the Leander coxless four with John Fenning, Gordon Thomson and Harold Barker which won a silver medal for Great Britain rowing at the 1908 Summer Olympics, and lost to the Magdalen College, Oxford crew.

References

External links
profile

1885 births
1974 deaths
English male rowers
British male rowers
Olympic rowers of Great Britain
Rowers at the 1908 Summer Olympics
Olympic silver medallists for Great Britain
Olympic medalists in rowing
Medalists at the 1908 Summer Olympics